The Districts of South Sulawesi are an administrative division for South Sulawesi, a province of Indonesia that is made up of regencies and independent cities which are both in turn divided into districts called Kecamatan.

Five years after independence, the government issued Law No. 21 of 1950, which became the basis of the legal establishment for what was then the Sulawesi province. Ten years later, the government passed Law No. 47 of 1960 which endorsed the formation of the South/Southeast Sulawesi province. Four years after that, with Act No. 13 of 1964, the provinces of South Sulawesi and Southeast Sulawesi were separated. Forty years later, the South Sulawesi government was split into two, with the regencies of Majene, Mamasa, Mamuju, Pasangkayu, and Polewali Mandar having been separated off to form a new West Sulawesi province on 5 October 2004 under Act No. 26 of 2004.

Regencies and cities 

Following the splitting away of part (five regencies) of the province to form a separate West Sulawesi Province in 2004, the remaining South Sulawesi Province was divided into twenty regencies (kabupaten) and three independent cities (kota), but a twenty-first regency - North Toraja - was formed on 24 June 2008 from the northern half of Tana Toraja Regency. These regencies and cities are listed below with their areas and their populations as of the 2010 Census and 2020 Census, together with the official estimates as at mid 2021. The table also includes the number of districts (kecamatan) in each regency or city, its administrative capital and its Human Development Index for 2018.

 # The 2000 Census population for Palopo city is included in the figure for Luwu Regency.
 * The 2000 Census population for North Toraja Regency is included in the figure for Tana Toraja Regency, which was formed in 2008 following the publication of Commission President Yudhoyono, numbered R.68/Pres/12/2007 on 10 December 2007, regarding the expansion of the twelve original districts and cities.
 *** The 2000 Census population for East Luwu Regency is included in the figure for North Luwu Regency.

Districts
The 307 districts of South Sulawesi, and their regencies or cities in which they are situated, are as follows:

 Ajangale, Bone
 Alla Timur, Enrekang
 Alla, Sulawesi Enrekang
 Amali, Sulawesi, Bone
 Anggeraja Timur, Enrekang
 Anggeraja, Enrekang
 Angkona, Luwu Timur
 Arungkeke, Jeneponto
 Awan Rante Karua, Toraja Utara
 Awangpone, Bone
 Bacukiki, Pare-Pare
 Baebunta, Luwu Utara
 Bajeng, Gowa
 Bajo, Sulawesi, Luwu
 Balocci, Kepulauan Pangkajene
 Balusu, Barru
 Balusu, Toraja Utara
 Bangkala Barat, Jeneponto
 Bangkala, Jeneponto
 Bangkelekila, Toraja Utara
 Bantaeng, Bantaeng
 Bantimurung, Maros
 Baraka, Enrekang
 Baranti, Sidenreng Rappang
 Barebbo, Bone
 Barombong, Gowa
 Barru, Barru
 Baruppu, Toraja Utara
 Bassesangtempe, Luwu
 Batang, Jeneponto
 Batulappa, Pinrang
 Buki, Selayar (link to Indonesian article)
 Belawa, Sulawesi, Wajo
 Belopa, Luwu
 Bengo, Sulawesi, Bone
 Benteng, Selayar (link to Indonesian language article)
 Binamu, Jeneponto
 Biring Kanaya, Makassar
 Biringbulu, Gowa
 Bissappu, Bantaeng
 Bituang, Tana Toraja
 Bola, Indonesia, Wajo
 Bone-Bone, Luwu Utara
 Bonggakaradeng, Tana Toraja
 Bontobahari
 Bontoala, Makassar
 Bontocani, Bone
 Bontoharu, Selayar
 Bontomanai, Selayar
 Bontomarannu, Gowa
 Bontomatene, Selayar
 Bontonompo, Gowa
 Bontoramba, Jeneponto
 Bontosikuyu, Selayar
 Bontotiro, Bulukumba
 Bua Ponrang, Luwu
 Bua, Indonesia, Luwu
 Bulukumpa, Bulukumba
 Bulupoddo, Sinjai
 Bungaya, Gowa
 Bungoro, Kepulauan Pangkajene
 Buntao Rantebua, Tana Toraja
 Buntao, Toraja Utara
 Burau, Luwu Timur
 Camba, Sulawesi, Maros
 Cempa, Pinrang
 Cenrana, Bone
 Cenrana, Maros
 Cina, Bone
 Donri Donri, Soppeng
 Dua Boccoe, Bone
Duampanua, Pinrang
Duapitue, Sidenreng Rappang
Enrekang Selatan, Enrekang
Enrekang, Enrekang
Eremerasa, Bantaeng
Galesong Selatan, Takalar
Galesong Utara, Takalar
Ganra, Soppeng
Gantarang, Bulukumba
Gantarangkeke, Bantaeng
Gilireng, Wajo
Hero Lange-Lange, Bulukumba
Kahu, Bone
Kajang
Kajuara, Bone
Kalukuang Masalima, Kepulauan Pangkajene
Kamanre, Luwu
Kapala Pitu, Toraja Utara
Keera, Wajo
Kelara, Jeneponto
Kesu, Toraja Utara
Kindang, Bulukumba
Kulo, Sidenreng Rappang
Labakkang, Kepulauan Pangkajene
Lalabata, Soppeng
Lamasi, Luwu
Lamuru, Bone
Lanrisang, Pinrang
Lappariaja, Bone
Larompong
Laronpong Selatan, Luwu
Latimojong, Luwu
Lau, Maros
Lembang, Pinrang
Libureng, Bone
Lili Riaja, Soppeng
Lili Rilau, Soppeng
Limbong, Luwu Utara
Liukang Tangaya, Kepulauan Pangkajene
Liukang Tupabbiring, Kepulauan Pangkajene
Ma'Rang, Kepulauan Pangkajene
Maiwa Atas, Enrekang
Maiwa, Enrekang
Majauleng, Wajo
Makale, Tana Toraja
Makassar, Makassar
Malangke Barat, Luwu Utara
Malangke, Luwu Utara
Malili, Luwu Timur
Mallawa, Maros
Mallusetasi, Barru
Mamajang, Makassar
Mandai, Maros
Mandalle, Kepulauan Pangkajene
Mangara Bombang, Takalar
Manggala, Makassar
Mangkutana, Luwu Timur
Maniang Pajo, Wajo
Mappakasunggu, Takalar
Mappedeceng, Luwu Utara
Mare, Bone
Mario Riawa, Soppeng
Mario Riwawo, Soppeng
Mariso, Makassar
Maritengngae, Sidenreng Rappang
Maros Baru, Maros
Maros Utara, Maros
Marusu, Maros
 Masamba
Mattiro Bulu, Pinrang
Mattirosompe, Pinrang
Mengkendek, Tana Toraja
Minasa Te'ne, Kepulauan Pangkajene
Moncongloe, Maros
Nanggala, Toraja Utara
Nuha, Luwu Timur
Pajukukang, Bantaeng
Palakka, Bone
Paleteang, Pinrang
Pallangga, Gowa
Panakkukang, Makassar
Panca Lautang, Sidenreng Rappang
Panca Rijang, Sidenreng Rappang
Pangkajene, Kepulauan Pangkajene
Parangloe, Gowa
 Pasilambena, Selayar
 Pasimarannu, Selayar
 Pasimasunggu, Selayar
 Pasimasunggu Timur, Selayar
Patallassang, Takalar
Patampanua, Pinrang
Patimpeng, Bone
Penrang, Wajo
Pitu Riase, Sidenreng Rappang
Pitu Riawa, Sidenreng Rappang
 Pitumpanua
Polobangkeng Selatan, Takalar
Polobangkeng Utara, Takalar
Poncang, Luwu
Ponre, Bone
Pujananting, Barru
Pulau Sembilan, Sinjai
Rampi, Luwu Utara
Rantebua, Toraja Utara
Rantepao, Toraja Utara
Rantetayo, Tana Toraja
Rappocini, Makassar
Riau Ale, Bulukumba
Rindingalo, Toraja Utara
Sa'dan, Toraja Utara
Sabbang Paru, Wajo
Sabbang, Luwu Utara
Sajoanging, Wajo
Salomekko, Bone
Saluputti, Tana Toraja
Sangalla, Tana Toraja
Sanggalangi, Toraja Utara
Segeri, Kepulauan Pangkajene
Seko, Luwu Utara
Sesean Suloara, Toraja Utara
Sesean, Toraja Utara
Sibulue, Bone
Sidenreng, Sidenreng Rappang
Simbang, Maros
Simbuang, Tana Toraja
Sinjai Barat, Sinjai
Sinjai Borong, Sinjai
Sinjai Selatan, Sinjai
Sinjai Tengah, Sinjai
Sinjai Timur, Sinjai
Sinjai Utara, Sinjai
Sinoa, Bantaeng
Somba Opu, Gowa
Sopai, Toraja Utara
Soppeng Riaja, Barru
Soreang, Pare-Pare
Sukamaju, Luwu Utara
Suli, Luwu
Suppa, Pinrang
Takabonerate, Selayar
Takkalalla, Wajo
Tallinglipu Dende' Piongan Napo, Toraja Utara
Tallo, Makassar
Tamalanrea, Makassar
Tamalatea, Jeneponto
Tana Sitolo, Wajo
Tanete Riaja, Barru
Tanete Riattang Barat, Bone
Tanete Riattang Timur, Bone
Tanete Riattang, Bone
Tanete Rilau, Barru
Tanralili, Maros
Tellu Limpoe, Bone
Tellu Limpoe, Sinjai
Tellu Siattinge, Bone
Tellulimpo E, Sidenreng Rappang
Telluwanua, Palopo
Tempe, Wajo
Tikala, Toraja Utara
Tinggimoncong, Gowa
Tiroang, Pinrang
Tombolo Pao, Gowa
Tomoni, Luwu Timur
Tompobulu, Bantaeng
Tompobulu, Gowa
Tompu Bulu, Maros
Tondon, Toraja Utara
Tondong Talasa, Kepulauan Pangkajene
Tonra, Bone
Towuti, Luwu Timur
Turatea, Jeneponto
Turikale, Maros
Ujung Bulu, Bulukumba
Ujung Loe, Bulukumba
Ujung Pandang, Makassar
Ujung Tanah, Makassar
Ujung, Pare-Pare
Ulaweng, Bone
Uluere, Bantaeng
Wajo, Makassar
Walenrang, Luwu
Wara Selatan, Palopo
Wara, Palopo
Watang Pulu, Sidenreng Rappang
Watang Sawitto, Pinrang
Wotu, Luwu Timur

References

 
South Sulawesi